Zasun (Russian and Tajik: Зосун Zosun) is a village in Sughd Region, northern Tajikistan. It is part of the jamoat Ayni in the Ayni District, and located east of the village Ayni.

References

Populated places in Sughd Region